Donna Harris may refer to:

 Donna Harris (The Bill), a character on the TV series The Bill
 Donna Harris, a character in the American sitcom Sanford and Son